Byrma may refer to several places in Russia:

Byrma, Kishertsky District, Perm Krai, a village in Kishertsky District, Perm Krai
Byrma, Permsky District, Perm Krai, a settlement in Permsky District, Perm Krai
Byrma (river), a river in Perm Krai